Kamil Kriger (born 2 April 1987) is a Polish handball player for MMTS Kwidzyn and the Polish national team.

He competed at the 2010 European Men's Handball Championship.

References

1987 births
Living people
Polish male handball players
People from Kartuzy
Vive Kielce players